The III Velká Cena Masarykova (1932 Masaryk Grand Prix, III Masarykův okruh) was a 750 kg Formula race held on 4 September 1932 at the Masaryk Circuit.

Classification

References

Grand Prix race reports
Masaryk
Masaryk